General elections were held in Luxembourg on 13 June 1999, alongside European Parliament elections. The Christian Social People's Party remained the largest party, winning 19 of the 60 seats in the Chamber of Deputies. It formed a coalition government with the Democratic Party.

Candidates

Results

By locality

The CSV won pluralities in three of the four circonscriptions, falling behind the Democratic Party in Centre (around Luxembourg City) but beating the LSAP in its core Sud constituency.  Much of the realignment nationally can be explained by a weakening of the LSAP's position in Sud, which has the most seats and where the LSAP's share of the vote fell from 33.5% to 29.8%, to the advantage of both the CSV and the DP.

The CSV won pluralities across almost all of the country, winning more votes than any other party in 86 of the country's (then) 118 communes.  The LSAP won pluralities in 14 communes, mostly in the Red Lands in the south.  The DP won 18 communes, particularly in its heartland of Luxembourg City and the surrounding communes.

References

Chamber of Deputies (Luxembourg) elections
Luxembourg
Legislative election, 1999
June 1999 events in Europe